Sir Russell Matthews  (19 July 1896 – 25 November 1987) was a New Zealand civil engineer, roading contractor, businessman, horticulturist and philanthropist. He was born in New Plymouth, New Zealand, on 19 July 1896. Together with his wife Mary, Matthews purchased a property on Mangorei Road, New Plymouth in 1931 and began developing a substantial garden during the Great Depression. The garden, which was named Tūpare, is owned by the Taranaki Regional Council and has been awarded a six star rating by the New Zealand Garden Council, one of only 13 in New Zealand.

He was appointed an Officer of the Order of the British Empire in the 1971 New Year Honours, for services to the community, and a Knight Bachelor in the 1982 New Year Honours, for services to horticulture and the community.

In 2018, Matthews was posthumously inducted into the New Zealand Business Hall of Fame.

References

1896 births
1987 deaths
New Zealand horticulturists
New Zealand philanthropists
New Zealand Officers of the Order of the British Empire
New Zealand Knights Bachelor
People from New Plymouth
20th-century New Zealand businesspeople
20th-century New Zealand engineers
20th-century philanthropists